Shail Upadhya (1935-2013) was a Nepalese diplomat, United Nations disarmament expert and fashion designer.

Career
As a second career, Upadhya worked as a fashion designer, becoming a social fixture in New York City, known for his flamboyant and colorful suits and outfits. He was a prominent presence in the 2011 documentary film Bill Cunningham New York, about New York Times fashion photographer Bill Cunningham. He lived in New York City, Southampton, New York, and Miami, Florida.

Upadhya was interviewed on Da Ali G Show by Sacha Baron Cohen's character Brüno at New York Fashion Week.

References

2013 deaths
Nepalese artists
1936 births
Nepalese fashion designers